Kearney and Trecker founded in 1898 by Edward J. Kearney and Theodore Trecker was a machine manufacturer based in West Allis, Wisconsin. It became one of the largest machine tool suppliers in the world.

History

The company was founded in 1898 and their first location was above a small shop. They soon became known for created milling machines and precision machine tools. By 1943 they were one of three largest milling machine manufacturers in the United States.

In 1965 the company was a leading automated tool maker, and had sales of more than 47 million dollars. They manufactured more than 100 different boring and milling machines. They merged with the Rockwell Standard corporation in 1965.

By 1955 the company had grown to become one of the largest machine tool suppliers in the world. The factories of Kearney & Trecker covered a 95-acre compound. In 1955 they had 2,250 employees.

In 1979 Kearney & Trecker merged with the Cross Company and became the Cross & Trecker, and just 12 years later, it was purchased by Giddings & Lewis, Inc.

References

History of manufacturing
Manufacturing companies based in Wisconsin